Ossee Lee Bodenhamer (June 27, 1891 – June 19, 1933) was an American businessman who served as the 12th national commander of The American Legion from 1929 to 1930.

Biography 
Ossee Lee Bodenhamer was born in Goldthwaite, Texas, graduating from Baylor University with a bachelor's degree in 1914. During World War I, he served in Georgia, Ohio, and Texas as an infantry officer. After the war, Bodenhamer moved to El Dorado, Arkansas, where he established a successful real estate company. At the 11th national convention in 1929, he was unanimously elected national commander of The American Legion. In 1932, he unsuccessfully sought the Democratic nomination for the U.S. Senate, losing in the primary election to Hattie Caraway. He died in Shreveport, Louisiana, on June 19, 1933.

Honors 
 Doctor of Laws (honoris causa), Baylor University, 1930

See also 
 List of Baylor University people
 List of Liberty ships

Notes

References

External links 

 
 
 O. L. Bodenhamer at The Political Graveyard

20th-century American businesspeople
20th-century American educators
20th-century Baptists
American real estate brokers
Arkansas Democrats
Baptists from Texas
Baylor University alumni
Burials in Arkansas
Deaths from fire in the United States
Howard Payne University alumni
Language teachers
Lions Clubs International
Military personnel from Texas
National Commanders of the American Legion
People from Brownwood, Texas
People from El Dorado, Arkansas
People from Goldthwaite, Texas
People from Mason, Texas
Schoolteachers from Texas
Southern Baptists
Texas Oil Boom people
United States Army officers
United States Army personnel of World War I